Josh Venable (born March 31) is a radio personality best known for hosting "The Adventure Club" on 
102.1 The Edge in Dallas. He is currently heard on 
Z104.5 in Tulsa.

He is known for bashing bands on-air and for discussing his personal life.

Career

Education and early work 
Venable attended Grapevine High School and the University of North Texas. Given a high school internship by George Gimarc, Venable worked his way up to helping out with shows like "The Adventure Club" and "The Retro Show."

The Adventure Club 
"The Adventure Club" aired intermittently on KYSR and KDGE, playing a mix of American and British indie rock, local, punk and classic alternative music. The show was responsible for breaking Texas bands such as Old 97's and The Polyphonic Spree as well as internationally recognized bands such as Weezer, Coldplay, and Oasis.

When the original host of The Adventure Club (Alex Luke) left for another job in St. Louis, Venable—though still inexperienced—was offered the hosting job in 1994. He asked fellow KDGE employee Keven McAlester to co-host. Most shows contained a healthy dose of bickering. McAlester left the show in 1997 for the film industry in LA; he went on to direct the feature You're Gonna Miss Me as well as music videos for Spoon and Old 97's.

Venable, who worked late nights, overnights, and weekends, was promoted to Music Director at 102.1 The Edge in 2006 but was laid off in 2007 due to budget constraints at Clear Channel.
 He found a job at 98.7FM KYSR in Los Angeles doing "afternoon drive" from 2 pm–7 pm. In February 2008, KDGE rehired Venable to do nights remotely from Los Angeles. "The Adventure Club" was brought back in July 2008. He later switched to the 10 am–2 pm shift in Dallas.

Later work 
Venable became Music Director of KYSR in 2009 and Program Director of KDGE in 2011. After being laid off again in December 2012, Venable started a music blog called A Wide Open Space.

In 2013, he was hired by Tulsa alternative rock station KMYZ as program director and afternoon personality. In 2015, he moved to the morning show at KMYZ.

He was given shout outs from Coldplay onstage in Dallas on the X&Y tour and in Tulsa by the band in 2016. Venable has hinted on the air that he and Chris Martin from Coldplay had a "serious personal talk" that day before the show.

in 2021, "Artifacts: Live At The Adventure Club" was released. The double vinyl collection was of DFW bands Venable had recorded in the radio studio.  The proceeds went to charity and included The Rocket Summer, Eisley, Old 97's and more.

Personal life 
His favorite bands include The Smiths, The Cure, R.E.M. and Bruce Springsteen. He sang in tribute/cover bands dedicated to Bruce Springsteen and The Smiths, and he stated many times on-air that he wished he were a rock star. The Springsteen tribute band, which made annual performances, was called "Nightmare On E Street." It included members of the bands The Crash That Took Me and Here, In Arms.  Panic (Smiths tribute) Has been active since 2012. They were once named best cover band in DFW by the Dallas Observer magazine. Over the years, they have opened for Blue October, New Politics and Andrew McMahon.

On-air schedule
 104.5 KMYZ, Tulsa, 6A-10A

Awards and nominations

References

External links
Josh Pages at 98.7
Josh Pages at KDGE
The Adventure Club with Josh

Living people
American radio personalities
People from Los Angeles County, California
Year of birth missing (living people)